The 1996 Argentina rugby union tour of England was a series of seven matches played by the Argentina national rugby union team in November and December 1996.

Matches
Scores and results list Argentina's points tally first.

References

1996
1996
History of rugby union matches between Argentina and England
England
1996–97 in English rugby union